Teterboro is a commuter railroad station for NJ Transit in the borough of Hasbrouck Heights, Bergen County, New Jersey, United States. The station is located on the Pascack Valley Line near U.S. Route 46 (US 46) and Teterboro Airport between Wood-Ridge and Essex Street. Teterboro station consists of one low-level platform with a shelter accessible at the Catherine Street and US 46 ramps.

History 
The station opened on the Erie Railroad's New Jersey and New York Railroad Division on May 29, 1904, as Williams Avenue, named after the street in Hasbrouck Heights that used to cross at the station. The station was one of two in Hasbrouck Heights, with the other station at Malcolm Avenue. The namesake street, Williams Avenue, was cut off at the railroad tracks in August 1934. In 1967, as part of consolidation efforts, the railroad closed the Hasbrouck Heights station and demolished it due to construction of Route 17. Under NJ Transit, Teterboro had no weekend service, and with the exception for one late-night outbound local train from Hoboken. However, on November 8, 2020, NJ Transit introduced full weekend service.

Station layout
The station has one track and one low-level side platform four cars long to its east. Although it was formerly named Williams Avenue, that street dead-ends on the line on the opposite side of the platform (since August 17, 1934) which can only be accessed by Green Street that runs alongside it. Since there is no way to reach the station from its west side, customers from there often illegally crossed the tracks from the Williams Avenue dead-end to reach the platform. In February 2013, New Jersey Transit built a barbed-wire fence on this dead-end, forcing riders from the west side to loop around the station through Route 46 and Route 17, neither of which have sidewalks, to reach it.

The platform has a wide painted yellow line below track level and a silver highway guard rail (with gaps to enter it) separating it from the 27-space parking lot that is in between it and Green Street. The southern end of the platform in the tiny area south of the parking lot's end has a bike rack for two behind a single wooden bench. There is a tiny silver shelter that has another bench next to the station's only ticket vending machine.

References

External links

 Station from Google Maps Street View

NJ Transit Rail Operations stations
Railway stations in Bergen County, New Jersey
Former Erie Railroad stations
Hasbrouck Heights, New Jersey
Teterboro, New Jersey
Demolished railway stations in the United States
Railway stations in the United States opened in 1904
1904 establishments in New Jersey